The Masurian ethnolect (Masurian: mazurská gádkä;), according to some linguists, is a dialect group of the Polish language; others consider Masurian to be a separate language, spoken by the Masurian people in northeastern Poland.

History 
From the 14th century, some settlers from Masovia started to settle in southern Prussia, which had been devastated by the crusades of the Teutonic Knights against the native Old Prussians. According to other sources, people from Masovia did not move to southern Prussia until the time of the Protestant Reformation, Prussia having become Lutheran in 1525. The Masurians were mostly of the Protestant faith, in contrast to the neighboring Roman Catholic people of the Duchy of Masovia, which was incorporated into the Polish kingdom in 1526. A new dialect developed in Prussia, isolated from the remaining Polish language area. The Masurian dialect group has many Low Saxon, German and Old Prussian words mixed in with Polish-language endings.

Beginning in the 1870s, Imperial German officials restricted the usage of languages other than German in Prussia's eastern provinces.
While in 1880 Masurians were still treated as Poles by the German Empire, at the turn of century the German authorities undertook several measures to Germanise and separate them from the Polish nation by creating a separate identity. After World War I the East Prussian plebiscite was held on July 11, 1920 according to the Treaty of Versailles, in which the Masurians had to decide whether they wanted to be part of the Second Polish Republic or remain in German East Prussia; about 98% voted for Germany.

By the early 20th century, most Masurians were at least bilingual and could speak Low Saxon and German; in some areas about half of them still spoke Masurian, at least at home. In 1900, according to the German census there were 142,049 Masurians speaking Masurian.  In 1925, only 40,869 people gave Masurian as their native language, many considering German their first language, considering Masurian merely as their domestic dialect, By the early 1920s there were also some Masurians who had their separate identity, claiming that Masurians are a nation. Most of them were members of Masurenbund. Their main goal was to grant Masurians some minority laws inside Germany, but there were also some separatists. In the early 1930s, support for the Nazi Party was high in Masuria, especially in elections in 1932 and 1933. Nazi political rallies were organized in the Masurian dialect during the campaigning.

After 1933 the usage of the Masurian dialect was prohibited by the National Socialist authorities. By 1938 most Masurian place and personal names had been changed to "pure" German substitutes. From 1939 on it was forbidden to hold church services in Masurian.

The replacement of Masurian in favor of German was not completed by the time the Soviet Red Army conquered Masurian East Prussia in January 1945, in World War II. The territory was transferred to Poland according to the postwar Potsdam Conference. During the wartime fighting and post-war deportations in the subsequent decades, most Masurian-speakers left Masuria for western Germany, especially to post-war West Germany, where they were quickly assimilated into the German mainstream.

Situation in 21st century 
According to some scientists such as Andrzej Sakson, there are about 5,000–10,000 ethnic Masurians left in Poland. According to the Polish census from 2011, there are only 1,376 of them who identify themselves as Masurians. Most Masurians live in Germany now, but due to the German law the ethnicity and nationality are not determined in their census.

There is a lack of surveys on the knowledge of the ethnolect both in Poland and Germany. However, the elderly can communicate in Masurian with some fluency. The sole group who speak Masurian on a daily basis are the so-called Russian Masurians, who are the descendants of colonists who arrived in Siberia at the end of the 19th century. They have lived in isolation from the other groups, thus they were neither Germanized nor Polonized, although their speech acquired many Russian loanwords.

Nowadays, there are several organizations promoting the dialect. Since 2015, the Sorkwity Masurian Culture Festival started to promote Masurian, locals are starting to create folk music, and some schools are organizing competitions in speaking Masurian. People are also starting to promote the ethnolect via social media. Meanwhile, some activists have also started a process of linguistical normalization to promote and save the ethnolect.

In 2016, the online dictionary Glosbe introduced Masurian to their data.

Books in Masurian 
The oldest book written in Masurian probably is Ta Swenta Woyna, written by Jakub Szczepan in 1900. 

In 2018, The Little Prince by Antoine de Saint Exupéry was translated to Masurian.

Dialect or language 
Several scientists consider Masurian to be a separate language in its own right; others argue that Masurian is a dialect of Polish, or even just a subdialect.

Linguistic features 
 Mazuration: the dentalization of the Standard Polish retroflex consonants  to 
 The post-palatals  are sometimes fronted to the alveolo-palatal , similarly to Kashubian
 Labialization of the vowel o (sometimes also u) initially
 ,  and  all merge into  before , e.g. buł , zuł  (był, żył)
 Denasalization of the nasal vowels ą and ę to o and e
 In some varieties ę becomes ã (nasal a), which is pronounced after denasalization an. Analogous changes occur for groups eN, like dzień – dzian

Dialects of Masurian 
Masurian has three to five dialects:
 Ostróda dialect (Ostróda, Olsztynek) – Denasalization of the nasal vowels ą and ę as o and e – No mazuration – Common á – Labialization  (ô, û – uo, uu) – Before  ł vowels i and y pronounced like u, e.g. buł, zuł (był, żył).
 West-Masurian dialect (Działdowo, Nidzica, Szczytno) – Irregularly occurring á and labialization – Mni  where Polish mi (mniasto, kamnień) – As in Ostróda district appear and have dominant position  psi, bzi, (w)zi, f(si) to pchi, bhI etc. – Denasalization of the nasal vowels ą and ę as o and e.
 Center-Masurian dialect (Giżycko, Mrągowo, Pisz, Biała Piska) – The most common intermediate á – The most common archaic  ř (in Polish sound as rż) – Frequent labialization – Appear and have dominant position  pchi, bhI to psi, bzi etc. – Dominate pronunciation ni instead of mni – niasto, kanień etc.  - Soft k, g, ch when is before a for example kia, gia, chia – Polish ą i ę like ón, on, én, en.
 East-Masurian dialect (Łek, Ôleck) – Polish  ś, ć, ź pronounced like sz, cz, ż (for example spacz, bÿcz) – Á almost does not exist – a is frequently pronounced as a vowel intermediate between a and e (ä – mätkiä , as in American English trap) – Synchronous pronunciation of soft labials b', p', f', w change to bj, pj,  fj, wj – Ch  change to ś (kosianÿ, siätä) – Less frequent é and ó.
 North-Masurian dialect (Węgorzewo, Gołdap) – in the early 20th century almost disappeared, in the area Węgorzewa known for up to a few percent of the population (in the nineteenth century, more than half), in district of Gołdap 1% (in the nineteenth century, approx. 20%). – Very archaic sound for r – A relatively frequent á.

 Grammar 

 Inflectional cases 

 The verb "to be" 

In the singular it is possible to replace u with ÿ for example: (Já) buł/bÿł,  tÿsź buł/bÿł,  (Ón) buł/bÿł. It is also possible to create the future perfect tense with the structure  + , for example: (Já) Bénde koménderowač.

 Present tense conjugation 

 -ač 
The conjugation of regular verbs usually ending in -ač, for example znač (to know).

á will shorten to a if the word has more than one syllable. For example:

 dumač – to think (dumam, dumas, dumá, dumawa, dumata, dumajó)
 kupač – to buy (kupam, kupas, kupá, kupawa, kupata, kupajó)

 -eč 
The conjugation of regular verbs usually ending in -eč, for example mÿšléč (to think).

 -ovač 
The conjugation of regular verbs usually ending in -owač ", for example "koménderowač" (to give an order to someone).

 Conditional 

To create the conditional, as in the majority of Slavic languages, the verb root is taken (i.e. verb endings like ač, eč are not considered and the respective ending is added for the conditional mode. For example, znač (to know) → znabÿ (he/she would know).

bÿ in Masurian has also one more function, where it can be placed at the beginning of a sentence to make questions, or also to mean "whether"/"or"/"if". For example, Lejduje ni niénso/niéso, bÿ sźwÿnina, bÿ réntozina (I like meat, whether it [is] pork or beef), which in standard Polish: Lubię mięso, czy to wieprzowinę, czy wołowinę.

 Grammatical differences between Masurian and Standard Polish 

 Grammatical constructions with sense verbs 
Here, the structure is sense verb + object + verb.

 Writing system 

 Phonetics 

 rż – Raised alveolar non-sonorant trill
 ó – Close-mid back rounded vowel
 á – Open back unrounded vowel
 é (after i) – Close-mid front unrounded vowel
 ä – Near-open front unrounded vowel
 w – Voiced bilabial fricative
 f – Voiceless bilabial fricative
 sz – Voiceless palato-alveolar sibilant
 ż – Voiced palato-alveolar sibilant
 cz – Voiceless palato-alveolar affricate
 dż – Voiced palato-alveolar affricate
 ÿ – Near-close near-front unrounded vowel

 Vocabulary 

 Small dictionary 

 Toponymy 

 Names of months 

 Examples 
 Lord's Prayer 

 Song 
A short Masurian song.

 Poem Réjza'

siodám ná koło

kiej féin pogodá

dumám tédÿ

nád zÿciem Mazurá

ajw násu ziamiá

ôddÿcha w dáli

ány rÿchtÿk pozwalá

mniá do dumániá

nád mójá réjzá

přéd siébie chućko jidé

ná drogách zÿciá

chtóré ûmÿká

chtórégo nie zabácé

po śmiérci, chtóra z latámi

přéniká …

wsÿtko je féin

ajw ji téraz

jék budzié po tym co přÿjdzié

nié ziém…?

jédno jé péwné zé ajw jé féin

ná mójéj réjzié ..

See also 
 Dialects of the Polish language
 Languages of Europe
 Polish language
 Silesian language

References 

Culture of Prussia
Languages of Germany
Lechitic languages
Languages of Poland
Polish dialects